The 2019 UNLV Rebels football team represented the University of Nevada, Las Vegas in the 2019 NCAA Division I FBS football season. The Rebels were led by fifth year head coach Tony Sanchez and played their home games at Sam Boyd Stadium. They were members of the West Division of the Mountain West Conference. They finished the season 4–8, 2–6 in Mountain West play to finish in a three-way tie for fourth place in the West division. On November 25, UNLV and Sanchez agreed that he would leave as head coach after the team's final game of the season.

This was the final season UNLV played at Sam Boyd Stadium, with their November 23 match against San Jose State being the final game at the site. The Rebels will move into the newly constructed Allegiant Stadium in 2020 where they will share the venue with the National Football League's Las Vegas Raiders.

Previous season
The 2018 UNLV Rebels football team went 4–8 overall and 2–6 in Conference play last year and did not qualify for a bowl game last season.

Preseason

Media poll
The preseason poll was released at the Mountain West media days on July 23, 2019. The Rebels were predicted to finish in fifth place in the MW West Division.

Schedule

Game summaries

Southern Utah

Arkansas State

at Northwestern

at Wyoming

Boise State

at Vanderbilt

at Fresno State

San Diego State

at Colorado State

Hawaii

San Jose State

at Nevada

References

UNLV
UNLV Rebels football seasons
UNLV Rebels football